The 2016 Ricoh Women's British Open was played 28–31 July in England at the Woburn Golf and Country Club near Milton Keynes, Buckinghamshire, northwest of London. It was the 40th Women's British Open, and the 16th as a major championship on the LPGA Tour. It was the tenth Women's British Open at Woburn; the most recent was in 1999, prior to it becoming a major on the LPGA Tour. For the first time, it was held on the Marquess' Course, which opened in 2000.

Ariya Jutanugarn won her first major title, three strokes ahead of runners-up Mirim Lee and| Mo Martin, the 2014 champion.

Golf Channel and NBC televised the event in the United States for the first time, while BBC Sport handled the coverage in the UK, for the last time.

Course layout
Woburn Golf and Country Club

Source:

Field
The field for the tournament is set at 144, and most earn exemptions based on past performance on the Ladies European Tour, the LPGA Tour, previous major championships, or with a high ranking in the Women's World Golf Rankings. The rest of the field earn entry by successfully competing in qualifying tournaments open to any female golfer, professional or amateur, with a low handicap.

There are 17 exemption categories for the 2016 Women's British Open.

1. The top 15 finishers (and ties) from the 2015 Women's British Open.

Amy Boulden, Cristie Kerr, Kim Hyo-joo (8,12), Lydia Ko (8,9-LPGA,12), Minjee Lee (8), Teresa Lu, Maria McBride, Mika Miyazato, Anna Nordqvist (8), Suzann Pettersen (12), Melissa Reid, Ryu So-yeon, Luna Sobrón Galmés (a), Yani Tseng (11)
Inbee Park (11,12), injury, and Ko Jin-young did not play

2. The top 10 Ladies European Tour members in the Women's World Golf Rankings as of 28 June not exempt under (1).

Carlota Ciganda, Shanshan Feng (3,5,8,9-LET,12), Sandra Gal, Charley Hull (3,5), Karine Icher (5), Xi Yu Lin (5), Catriona Matthew (5,11), Azahara Muñoz, Su-Hyun Oh (3,5), Lee-Anne Pace

3. The top 30 LPGA Tour members in the Women's World Golf Rankings as of 28 June not exempt under (1).

Chella Choi, Choi Na-yeon (12), Chun In-gee (9-KLPGA,12), Brooke Henderson (8,12), Jang Ha-na (8), Ji Eun-hee, Ariya Jutanugarn (8), Kim Sei-young (8), Jessica Korda, Candie Kung, Brittany Lang (12), Alison Lee, Mirim Lee, Stacy Lewis (11), Brittany Lincicome (12), Mo Martin (11), Haru Nomura (8), Park Hee-young, Pornanong Phatlum, Gerina Piller, Morgan Pressel, Jenny Shin (8), Lexi Thompson (8,12)

4. The top 25 on the current LET money list as of 28 June not exempt under (1) or (2).

Beth Allen, Rebecca Artis, Isabelle Boineau (8), Lina Boqvist, Nicole Broch Larsen, Katie Burnett (5), Holly Clyburn (5), Georgia Hall, Nuria Iturrioz (8), Felicity Johnson, Stacey Keating, Camilla Lennarth, Chloe Leurquin, Nanna Koerstz Madsen (8), Caroline Masson (5), Becky Morgan, Florentyna Parker, Emily Kristine Pedersen, Pamela Pretswell, Marianne Skarpnord, Noora Tamminen, Kylie Walker, Linda Wessberg, Angel Yin, Liz Young

5. The top 40 on the current LPGA Tour money list as of 28 June not exempt under (1) or (3).

Marina Alex, Baek Kyu-jung, Jacqui Concolino, Paula Creamer, Austin Ernst, Jodi Ewart Shadoff, M. J. Hur, Tiffany Joh, Moriya Jutanugarn, Danielle Kang, Kim Kaufman, Megan Khang, Christina Kim, In-Kyung Kim, Lee Mi-hyang, Pernilla Lindberg, Gaby López, Ai Miyazato, Ryann O'Toole, Beatriz Recari, Paula Reto, Lizette Salas, Alena Sharp, Jennifer Song, Nontaya Srisawang, Angela Stanford, Kelly Tan, Karrie Webb, Jing Yan, Sakura Yokomine, Yoo Sun-young (12)

6. The top five on the current LPGA of Japan Tour (JLPGA) money list as of 28 June not exempt under (1), (2), (3), or (13).

Bae Hee-kyung, Asuka Kashiwabara, Yukari Nishiyama, Ai Suzuki, Momoko Ueda

7. The top two on the current LPGA of Korea Tour (KLPGA) money list as of 28 June not exempt under (1), (2), (3), or (6).

Park Sung-hyun
Jang Su-yeon did not play

8. Winners of any recognised LET or LPGA Tour events in the calendar year 2016.

Lee Jung-min, Jiyai Shin (11,13)

9. Winners of the 2015 LET, LPGA, JLPGA and KLPGA money lists.

all already exempt

10. Players ranked in the top 30 of the Women's World Golf Rankings as of 28 June, not exempt above.

all already exempt

11. Winners of the last 10 editions of the Women's British Open.

Lorena Ochoa and Sherri Steinhauer did not play

12. Winners of the last five editions of the U.S. Women's Open, ANA Inspiration, and Women's PGA Championship, and the Evian Championship winners from 2013 to 2015.

 Michelle Wie

13. Winner of the 2015 Japan LPGA Tour Championship Ricoh Cup.

already exempt

14. The leading five LPGA Tour members upon completion of 36 holes in the 2016 Cambia Portland Classic who have entered the Championship and who are not otherwise exempt.

Brianna Do, Lee Lopez, Kelly Shon, Mariajo Uribe, Cheyenne Woods

15. The leading three LET members in the 2016 Aberdeen Asset Management Ladies Scottish Open, who have entered the Championship and who are not otherwise exempt.

Caroline Hedwall, Gwladys Nocera, Isabella Ramsay

16. The 2016 British Ladies Amateur champion, 2015 U.S. Women's Amateur champion, 2015 International European Ladies Amateur Championship champion, winner or next available player in the 2015 LGU Order of Merit, and the Mark H. McCormack Medal holder provided they are still amateurs at the time of the Championship and a maximum of two other leading amateurs at the discretion of the Ladies' Golf Union.

Julia Engström, Leona Maguire, Olivia Mehaffey, Hannah O'Sullivan, María Parra

17. Any players granted special exemptions from qualifying by the Championship Committee.

Laura Davies

18. Balance of the 90 LPGA Tour members

Brittany Altomare, Ilhee Lee, Sarah Jane Smith

Qualifiers:
Aditi Ashok, Laetitia Beck, Cydney Clanton, Charlotte Ellis, Maha Haddioui, Lydia Hall, Mina Harigae, Wei-Ling Hsu, Vicky Hurst, Bronte Law (a), Maude-Aimee Leblanc, Amelia Lewis, Annie Park, Marta Sanz, Ashleigh Simon, Anne van Dam
Isabel Gabsa did not play due to a back injury

Nationalities in the field

Past champions in the field

Note: All past champions made the cut.

Round summaries

First round
Thursday, 28 July 2016

Mirim Lee tied the Women's British Open (and women's major) single-round record by shooting a 62 (10 under par). She led by three strokes over Ariya Jutanugarn.

Second round
Friday, 29 July 2016

Mirim Lee followed her record 62 in the first round with a 1-under-par 71 in the second round but still led by one stroke over Shanshan Feng and Ariya Jutanugarn. Catriona Matthew shot the low round of the day, 65, to move into a tie for fourth place.

Third round
Saturday, 30 July 2016

Ariya Jutanugarn shot a third round 66 to take a two-stroke lead over Mirim Lee.

Final round
Sunday, 31 July 2016

The day's low score was 67 by Caroline Masson, who played early and climbed up to tie for 25th place. Among those on the leaderboard, the best score was 70; Jutanugarn carded 72 and won by three strokes. The lead was four strokes over Mo Martin at the turn, but after a double bogey at 13, it was down to one over Mirim Lee, who birdied the first three holes of the back nine. Jutanugarn birdied 17 to extend the lead to two strokes, then Lee bogeyed the final hole to drop into a tie for second with Martin.

  
Source:

Scorecard
Final round

Cumulative tournament scores, relative to par

Source:

References

External links

LPGA.com - Women's British Open - microsite
Ladies European Tour: Women's British Open
Ladies Golf Union: Women's British Open 
Woburn Golf Club – Marquess' Course

Women's British Open
Golf tournaments in England
Sport in Milton Keynes
British Open
Women's British Open
Women's British Open
2010s in Buckinghamshire